Tomi Petrescu (born 24 June 1986), is a Finnish professional football winger and attacking midfielder who plays for Finnish Veikkausliiga side Ilves and has represented Finland national under-21 football team. Petrescu was born in Jyväskylä, Finland where he played for the local JJK youth team before moving to Leicester City F.C.

Club career

Early career 

Petrescu's career began in the junior organisation of JJK Jyväskylä. In 2001, he moved to Leicester's youth academy. In Leicester he represented the academy team and the reserves. He made one appearance in the first team on 4 May 2003 in a match against Wolverhampton Wanderers. When he failed to make a break through he terminated his contract in the end of 2004.

Inter Turku 

For season 2005 Petrescu joined Veikkausliiga team Inter Turku. where he quickly established his place in the midfield and scored seven goals during the season. During season 2006 he gained 20 caps and scored three goals.

Tampere United 

In December 2006 Petrescu signed a two-year contract with Tampere United. He stated that his main reason to join Tampere United was coach Ari Hjelm. Season 2007 was a true break through for Petrescu to the elite of Veikkausliiga. He was one of the key players that led the team two a second consecutive championship. During the second qualifying round of the 2007/2008 Champions League edition, Petrescu scored a goal to help Tampere secure a prestigious 1:0 win against Bulgarian champions Levski Sofia in their home game. Tampere repeated the feat in the away game and became the first Finnish side to eliminate a Bulgarian club from the high-profile competition. However, the Finns were unable to qualify for the group stages of the Champions League, as they were eliminated by Norwegian side Rosenborg BK in the third qualifying round.

In 2007, he was selected as the best footballer of Pirkanmaa.

He was loaned to Italian Ascoli for the spring of 2009. In Ascoli he made his first appearance on 7 March in a match against Grosseto.

Panthrakikos 

In January 2011 Petrescu joined Greek side Panthrakikos on a 1,5 years contract. He made just one appearance in the first team.

Honka 
Petrescu represented seasons 2011-12 FC Honka in the Veikkausliiga. He gained 32 caps and scored two goals.

Haka 
Petrescu transferred to FC Haka for the season 2013. During the fall of 2013 he made a short spell in Romanian first division side CSM Studențesc Iași.

Ilves 
After season 2013 he moved on to Ilves on a three-year contract.

JJK
On 23 June 2016, he returned to JJK on a three-year contract.

International career
Petrescu became well known after playing in the 2003 FIFA U-17 World Championship, which were held in Finland where he scored two of three goals of Finland. He scored a goal in the opening game against China in the tournament. He was nominated as candidate by head coach Markku Kanerva for the Finland U-21 team for the 2009 UEFA European Under-21 Championship finals but he suffered an injury one month prior to the tournament and was forced to withdraw.

Personal life
Petrescu's father is Romanian and he has got an older brother, Ștefan Petrescu, who also plays football.

Honours

Club
Tampere United
Veikkausliiga: 2007
Finnish Cup: 2007
Finnish League Cup: 2009

Honka
Finnish Cup: 2012
Finnish League Cup: 2011

Career statistics

Club

References

External links
 Tomi Petrescu at CSM Studențesc Iași 
 
 
 Veikkausliigan stats

1986 births
Living people
Sportspeople from Jyväskylä
Finnish footballers
Finland youth international footballers
Finland under-21 international footballers
Finnish people of Romanian descent
Veikkausliiga players
JJK Jyväskylä players
FC Inter Turku players
Tampere United players
Ascoli Calcio 1898 F.C. players
Leicester City F.C. players
FC Honka players
FC Haka players
FC Politehnica Iași (2010) players
Expatriate footballers in Greece
Liga II players
Serie B players
Football League (Greece) players
Association football midfielders